The 2010 Cork Premier Intermediate Football Championship was the fifth staging of the Cork Premier Intermediate Football Championship since its establishment by the Cork County Board in 2006. The draw for the opening round fixtures took place on 13 December 2009. The championship began on 8 May 2010 and ended on 30 October 2010.

Valley Rovers and Killavullen left the championship after their respective promotion and relegation to different grades. Carrigaline and Mallow joined the championship. Glanmire were relegated from the championship after being beaten in a playoff by Newmarket.

The final was played on 30 October 2010 at Páirc Uí Rinn in Cork, between Newcestown and Clyda Rovers. Newcestown won the final by 0-10 to 0-09 to claim their first championship title in the grade. It was Clyda Rovers' second successive final defeat.

Carrigaline's David Drake was the championship's top scorer with 0-39.

Team changes

To Championship

Promoted from the Cork Intermediate Football Championship
 Carrigaline

Relegated from the Cork Senior Football Championship
 Mallow

From Championship

Promoted to the Cork Senior Football Championship
 Valley Rovers

Relegated to the Cork Intermediate Football Championship
 Killavullen

Results

Round 1

Round 2

Round 3

Relegation playoff

Round 4

Quarter-finals

Semi-finals

Final

Championship statistics

Top scorers

Overall

In a single game

References

External link

2010 Cork PIFC results

Cork Premier Intermediate Football Championship